Eva Kjer Hansen (born 26 August 1964 in Aabenraa) is a former Danish politician, who was a member of the Folketing for the Venstre political party. She held many ministerial positions, the last being as minister of Fisheries, Gender Equality and Nordic Cooperation from 2 May 2018 to 27 June 2019. Hansen was a member of parliament from the 1990 Danish general election to the 2022 Danish general election where she was not re-elected.

Political career
She was the Danish Minister for Food, Agriculture and Fisheries as member of the Cabinet of Anders Fogh Rasmussen II, III and the Lars Løkke Rasmussen I Cabinet from 12 September 2007 until 23 February 2010, and she was Minister of Social Affairs and Minister for Women's Rights from 2 August 2004 to 12 September 2007, as member of the Cabinet of Anders Fogh Rasmussen I and II. As part of the Lars Løkke Rasmussen II Cabinet she was Minister for Food, Agriculture and Fisheries from 28 June 2015 until 29 February 2016. She was Minister for Gender Equality, Fisheries and Nordic Cooperation from 2 May 2018 to 27 June 2019. After the 2019 election Venstre became the opposition to the new Social Democrats government, and Hansen lost her position as minister. Having lost her seat in the Folketing following the 2022 Danish general election, Hansen quit politics, including resigning from her position as councilor in Kolding Municipality. Hansen intends to find a new job.

External links

References

1964 births
Living people
People from Aabenraa Municipality
Government ministers of Denmark
Venstre (Denmark) politicians
Women government ministers of Denmark
Women members of the Folketing
Agriculture ministers of Denmark
Danish Ministers for the Environment
21st-century Danish women politicians
Members of the Folketing 1990–1994
Members of the Folketing 1994–1998
Members of the Folketing 1998–2001
Members of the Folketing 2001–2005
Members of the Folketing 2005–2007
Members of the Folketing 2007–2011
Members of the Folketing 2011–2015
Members of the Folketing 2015–2019
Members of the Folketing 2019–2022